Islam Karimov Tashkent International Airport  is the main international airport of Uzbekistan and the 3rd busiest airport in Central Asia (after Almaty International Airport and Astana International Airport in Kazakhstan). It was named after Islam Karimov, the 1st president of Uzbekistan, from 1991 until his death in 2016.

History 
This ICAO Category II airport is the primary hub of Uzbekistan Airways, and is the largest international airport in Uzbekistan, and the busiest in Central Asia. The airport comprises two terminals: Terminal 2 receives international flights, Terminal 3 is for domestic traffic.

Uzbekistan Airways started flying from Tashkent to New York with Airbus A310s in March 1995. The airline's schedule later that year noted that the flights made a stop in Amsterdam. 

Terminal 2 was rebuilt in 2001, and renovations were completed in 2018. It has a capacity of 1000 passengers/hour and serves more than two million passengers per year. Other facilities include waiting lounges, CIP and VIP halls, restaurants and bars, currency exchange offices, duty-free shops, airlines ticket counters and sales offices, and a 24-hour pharmacy.

Terminal 3 opened in 2011 with a capacity of 400 passengers per hour. The two terminals are separated by the runway, requiring passengers transiting from international to domestic flights and vice versa to exit the airport in order to transfer between them. In July 2017, Uzbekistan Airways began offering nonstop service to New York using its Boeing 787 fleet.

The government of Uzbekistan is planning to relocate Tashkent Airport to a new site by 2030.

Airlines and destinations

Passenger

Cargo

See also 
 List of the busiest airports in the former USSR
 Transportation in Uzbekistan

References

External links 

 Tashkent International Airport on the website of Uzbekistan Airways
 NOAA/NWS current weather observations
 ASN Accident history for UTTT

Airports in Uzbekistan
Airport
Airport
Airports built in the Soviet Union